The spatula-toothed snake (Iguanognathus werneri) is a species of snake in the family Colubridae. The species is endemic to Indonesia.

Etymology
The specific name, werneri, is in honor of Austrian herpetologist Franz Werner.

Taxonomy
The species I. werneri is monotypic within the genus Iguanognathus.

Geographic range
I. werneri is known only from the holotype, which was collected in Sumatra, Indonesia.

Habitat
The natural habitat of I. werneri is unknown.

Description
All the teeth of I. werneri (mandibular, maxillary, and palatal) have spatulate crowns, which are ribbed along the outer side.

Reproduction
I. werneri is oviparous.

References

Further reading
Boulenger GA (1898). "Description of a new Genus of Aglyphous Colubrine Snakes from Sumatra". Annals and Magazine of Natural History, Seventh Series 2: 73–74. (Iguanognathus, new genus, p. 73; Iguanognathus werneri, new species, p. 74).
David P, Vogel G (1996). The Snakes of Sumatra: An annotated checklist and key with natural history notes. Frankfurt am Main: Chimaira. 259 pp. .
de Rooij N (1917). The Reptiles of the Indo-Australian Archipelago. II. Ophidia. Leiden: E.J. Brill. xiv + 334 pp. (Iguanognathus werneri, pp. 50–51).
Jackson K, Underwood G, Arnold EN, Savitzky AH (1999). "Hinged Teeth in the Enigmatic Colubrid, Iguanognathus werneri ". Copeia 1999 (3): 814–817.

Natricinae
Reptiles of Indonesia
Reptiles described in 1898
Taxa named by George Albert Boulenger
Taxonomy articles created by Polbot